is an opera by Antonio Sacchini, set to a libretto by Mattia Verazi. It was first performed in Schloss Ludwigsburg on 11 February 1770 and the ballets were set by French choreographer Louis Dauvigny.

The opera follows the usual pattern of opera seria of the time: secco recitative interlaced with da capo arias. Within this format Sacchini introduced strong dramatic music to suit the libretto: stromentato recitative is also used for extra dramatic effect, and the arias are sometimes interrupted by bursts of recitative. Stylistically, the work is thought to anticipate Italian opera of the following decade, and in particular Mozart's Il re pastore.

Roles

References
 Italianopera, 12 February 2011
 
 Marita P. McClymonds: "Calliroe",  Grove Music Online ed L. Macy (Retrieved 3 June 2007), grovemusic.com, subscription access.

Operas by Antonio Sacchini
Opera seria
Operas
Operas based on classical mythology
1770 operas